Studenitsite is a rare borate mineral with chemical formula of NaCa2[B9O14(OH)4]·2H2O.

Studenitsite has a vitreous luster, a Mohs hardness of 6 and color of light-dirty yellow. It is a monoclinic mineral and belongs to the space group P2/c.  The basic unit of the crystal structure[B9O14(OH)4]5-layers has a  Miller Index of (001).  Studenitsite has a low surface relief, which means the measure of the relative difference between the index of refraction of the mineral and surrounding medium is small. Birefringence is the difference between two principal indices of refraction of a uniaxial crystal. Studenitsite has a maximum birefringent value of δ = 0.032. Studenitsite has three indices of refraction. Their values are nα = 1.532, nβ = 1.538, nγ = 1.564. Indices of refraction are the ratio of the light's speed in the mineral and the medium.

Studenitsite is an extremely rare mineral that has only been found in the Piskaya deposit, Yarondolskii Basin, on the Ibar River, 280 km south of Belgrade, Serbia.  The deposit is classified as a volcanogenic-sedimentary borate deposit with clay and carbonate minerals.  It occurs associated with colemanite, howlite, ulexite and pentahydroborite.  It is a rare but important mineral for understanding the volcanic settings in Western Serbia.  It was named after the Studenica cloister near the discovery location.

See also

 List of minerals

References

Calcium minerals
Sodium minerals
Phylloborates
Monoclinic minerals
Minerals in space group 14